Parcela-Obory  is a village in the administrative district of Gmina Konstancin-Jeziorna, within Piaseczno County, Masovian Voivodeship, in east-central Poland, 23 km away from Warsaw.

References

Parcela-Obory